These are the results of the women's vault competition, one of six events for female competitors in artistic gymnastics at the 1996 Summer Olympics in Atlanta. The qualification and final rounds took place on July 21, 22 and 28th at the Georgia Dome.

Results

Qualification

Ninety-one gymnasts competed in the vault event during the compulsory and optional rounds on July 21 and 23.  The eight highest scoring gymnasts advanced to the final on July 28.  Each country was limited to two competitors in the final.

* Did not participate due to injury
** Replaced teammate Kerri Strug

Final

References
Official Olympic Report
www.gymnasticsresults.com

Women's Vault
1996 in women's gymnastics
Women's events at the 1996 Summer Olympics